Alice Anderson (born 1972) is a French-British artist.

Alice Anderson may also refer to:

Alice Anderson (writer) (born 1966), American poet
Alice Elizabeth Anderson (1897–1926), Australian mechanic and garage proprietor
Alice Anderson, one of the Breck Girls
Alice Anderson, character in FreeStyle Street Basketball

See also
 Anderson (disambiguation)